Steffen Walter Schmidt is a Colombian-born political scientist.

Schmidt was born in Colombia and is of German-Jewish descent. He attended Rollins College and earned a doctorate in public law and government from Columbia University. He taught at Southampton College prior to joining the faculty of Iowa State University in 1970. He became a member of Phi Kappa Phi in 1997, was appointed director of international programs for the College of Liberal Arts and Sciences in 2004, and was named inaugural Lucken Professor in Political Science in 2017. Dr. Schmidt has written a number of textbooks regarding the American Government and politics that are used in various colleges in the United States. Upon Schmidt's retirement, he was granted emeritus status and David A. M. Peterson was named Lucken Professor.

References

1940s births
Living people
Colombian expatriates in the United States
Iowa State University faculty
Rollins College alumni
Columbia University alumni
Colombian political scientists
Colombian people of German-Jewish descent